The St Ibb Open was a golf tournament on the Swedish Golf Tour and the Nordic Golf League. It was held at St Ibb Golf Club on the island of Ven in the Øresund strait, between Sweden and Denmark.

The tournament used a modified Stableford scoring format on the par-68 course.

Winners

References

Swedish Golf Tour events
Golf tournaments in Sweden
Recurring sporting events established in 2000
Recurring sporting events disestablished in 2010
2000 establishments in Sweden
2010 disestablishments in Sweden